The AAPI Victory Fund is a Political Action Committee that focuses on mobilizing Asian American and Pacific Islanders (AAPI) eligible voters and supports Democrat AAPI candidates.

In September 2019, the organization hosted the first Democratic Presidential Forum for the AAPI community. Held at the Segerstrom Center in Orange County, Presidential candidates Tulsi Gabbard, Tom Steyer, and Andrew Yang attended the townhall forum. On January 17, 2020, the AAPI Victory Fund endorsed Joe Biden for president. On May 5, 2021, they endorsed Andrew Yang for Mayor of New York City.

Contributions to Candidates 
Since its founding, AAPI Victory Fund has raised 2.8 million U.S. dollars and has made nearly $14,000 in individual contributions to presidential, senate, and house candidates. The organization spent $500,000 in independent expenditures.

Controversies 
On March 12, 2019, Open Secrets reported that a Chinese-owned company provided illegal contributions through its US-based American Pacific International Capital (APIC) to Jeb Bush's super PAC Right to Rise. APIC also made contributions to the AAPI Victory Fund and was the organization's fifth largest donor for the 2016 election cycle.

References

External links 
 

United States political action committees
Political organizations established in 2016